Deering was a town in Cumberland County, Maine which was incorporated in 1871 and annexed by the neighboring City of Portland in 1899. Until 1871, the town was part of Saccarappa, which also included what is now neighboring Westbrook. In that year, the towns split with little opposition. The 1880 United States Census counted 4,324 residents of the newly formed town. In 1892, Deering was incorporated as a city. In 1899, Deering was annexed by Portland, becoming the northern neighborhoods of the city.

References

External links
 Maps.bpl.org

1871 establishments in Maine
1898 disestablishments in Maine
Populated places established in 1871
Populated places disestablished in 1898
Former towns in Maine
History of Portland, Maine
Westbrook, Maine